{{Album ratings
| rev1      =Insiders' Guides
| rev1Score =  Review
|rev2=AllMusic|rev2Score=  [ Review]
|rev3=Billboard |rev3Score=[ Review]
|rev4=Click Music |rev4Score= 
|rev5=entertainment.ie|rev5Score=  Review
|rev6=Gilde|rev6Score=  Review
|rev7=The Guardian|rev7Score=  Review
|rev8=IndieLondon |rev8Score= Review
|rev9=Times Online |rev9Score= Review|noprose=yes}}Hand Built by Robots is the debut studio album by English singer-songwriter Newton Faulkner. Produced by Mike Spencer, it was released on 30 July 2007 on Ugly Truth Records. Preceded by the single "Dream Catch Me", the album initially charted at number 3 in the UK album chart, and subsequently reached number one in its fourth week. Regarding the album's success, Faulkner stated, "I don't think anyone involved in Hand Built by Robots actually thought it would do that at all."

Writing and composition
Regarding the album's composition, Faulkner stated, in 2009, that the album was "actually quite rushed in a lot of ways. 'Dream Catch Me' was actually released before we finished the album, so we had to move really fast to complete Hand Built By Robots. The album wasn't the culmination of ten years worth of writing, but was a few months of panic, and a couple of things I had lying around - a couple of older songs that were still good enough to be used. [...] A lot of Hand Built By Robot's songs were written in the last few months leading up to recording, as I became better at writing."

Four tracks on the album were co-written with former Longpigs vocalist Crispin Hunt and two were co-written by Adam Argyle, who is perhaps best known for writing "Next Best Superstar" for Melanie C.

Lyrics
The album's lyrics mainly explore dreams, aspirations and observations on society.

Album cover
The album cover art work includes a number of historical figures standing upon a robotic hand.

Track listing

Chart performanceHand Built by Robots was certified platinum and later double platinum, in the United Kingdom, and was the twentieth best-selling album of 2007, selling 444,000 copies.

The album debuted at number 26 on the Australian ARIA Albums Chart in March 2008. It subsequently ascended fifteen places the following week to number 11, and then to number 8. The album eventually peaked at number 5 the week after. It has since been certified Gold on the ARIA charts.

The album was released in Germany on 18 April 2008, and in the United States (it did not have massive success in the U.S. but did manage to reach number 42 on the Billboard'' Top Heatseekers chart) and Canada on 29 April 2008, with the first single being "Dream Catch Me".

Charts

Weekly charts

Year-end charts

Certifications

References

2007 debut albums
Newton Faulkner albums